Cleistanthus oblongifolius is a species of Asian trees, originally described by William Roxburgh and later placed by Johannes Müller Argoviensis; it is now included in the family Phyllanthaceae.

Distributed throughout Indochina and Malesia, its name in Vietnam is cọc rào; it has been recorded from: the Andaman & Nicobar Islands, Australia (Queensland), Bangladesh, Borneo, Cambodia, Java, Lesser Sunda  Islands, peninsular Malaysia, Maluku, Myanmar, New Guinea, Philippines, Solomon  Islands, Sulawesi, Sumatera, Thailand and Vietnam.

References

External links

oblongifolius
Flora of Indo-China
Flora of Malesia